The AY-3-8910 is a 3-voice programmable sound generator (PSG) designed by General Instrument in 1978, initially for use with their 16-bit CP1610 or one of the PIC1650 series of 8-bit microcomputers. The AY-3-8910 and its variants were used in many arcade games—Konami's Gyruss contains five—and pinball machines as well as being the sound chip in the Intellivision and Vectrex video game consoles, and the Amstrad CPC, Oric-1, Colour Genie, Elektor TV Games Computer, MSX, and later ZX Spectrum home computers. It was also used in the Mockingboard and Cricket sound cards for the Apple II and the Speech/Sound Cartridge for the TRS-80 Color Computer.

After General Instrument's spinoff of Microchip Technology in 1987, the chip was sold for a few years under the Microchip brand. It was also manufactured under license by Yamaha (with a selectable clock divider pin and a double-resolution and double-rate volume envelope table) as the YM2149F; the Atari ST uses this version. It produces very similar results to the Texas Instruments SN76489 and was on the market for a similar period.

The chips are no longer made, but functionally-identical clones are still in active production. An unofficial VHDL description is freely available for use with FPGAs.

Description 

The AY-3-8910 was essentially a state machine, with the state being set up in a series of sixteen 8-bit registers. These were programmed over an 8-bit bus that was used both for addressing and data by toggling one of the external pins. For instance, a typical setup cycle would put the bus into "address mode" to select a register, and then switch to "data mode" to set the contents of that register. This bus was implemented natively on GI's own CPUs, but it had to be recreated in glue logic or with the help of an additional interface adapter such as the MOS Technology 6522 when the chip was used with the much more common MOS Technology 6502 or Zilog Z80 CPUs.

Six registers controlled the pitches produced in the three primary channels. The wavelength to generate was held in two eight-bit registers dedicated to each channel, but the value was limited to 12-bits for other reasons, for a total of 4095 (the register value is used as the frequency divider and 0 is treated as 1) different pitches. Another register controlled the period of a pseudo-random noise generator (a total of 31 different cycle times), while another controlled the mixing of this noise into the three primary channels.

Three additional registers controlled the volume of the channels, as well as turning on or off the optional envelope controls on them. Finally the last three registers controlled the times of the envelope controller, by setting the envelope type and envelope cycle time. A total of eight envelope types include sawtooth shape or triangle shape, starting on either maximum or minimum. The shape can also be set to repeat for a cycling effect. A total of 65535 different cycle times can be set. As there was only one envelope shared between all three channels, many programmers ignored it and programmed their own envelope controllers in software (controlling volume directly). A well known trick was to run the hardware envelope at cycle times above 20 Hz to produce sawtooth or triangle-wave like bass sounds.

Although there are only 16 registers, the four MSB bits of the 8-bit bus must be set to the factory default '0000' value when selecting a register. Incorrectly setting the MSB bits causes the chip to ignore the register change. General Instruments did take orders for customized MSB bits (factory set to other than '0000'). The chips made with customize-set MSB register bits allow the same processor to control more than one AY chip on the same bus (e.g. TurboSound for ZX Spectrum). There are many new-old-stock (NOS) chips on the secondary market with MSB bits factory set to a non-'0000' value. The non-0000 value can cause significant developmental troubles for designers and repair technicians. Software must be written to identify the correct value of the MSB bits on any given chip. Also, software must be changed or hardware added to allow these factory set MSB chips to be used in place of the default '0000' chips.

The AY-3-8910 generates tones with base frequencies of up to 125 kHz (4 MHz input clock, or 6 MHz with the YM2149F), well beyond human perception and into the ultrasonic range. The existence of ultrasonic values is a consequence of the frequency-divider design; in order to have adequate resolution at audible frequencies it is necessary for the overall clock rate (and thus the output at small divisors) to be considerably higher than the audible range. Only divisors below 5 give entirely-ultrasonic output frequencies. Frequencies equivalent to the top octave of a piano keyboard can be defined with reasonable accuracy versus the accepted note values for the even-tempered scale, to nearly 1 Hz precision in the A440 range and even more finely at lower pitches. Despite the high maximum frequency, the ability to divide that figure by 4096 means the lowest directly definable output frequency is 30.6 Hz, roughly equal to B0, the third lowest note on a normal 88-key piano, and as good as subsonic with everyday speaker systems. In essence, the chip is able to produce decently musical output at all reasonable pitches found in most compositions.

By contrast, the SN76489 only has 10 bits of precision for its frequency dividers. Having the same base frequency of 125 kHz, it should in theory lack the two lowest octaves of the PSG. To get around this, the SN76489 plays its tone generators one octave lower than their calculated frequency, giving it one octave less in the bass and one octave less in the top compared to the PSG.

Variants 

The 8910 silicon chip was sold in three different packages.

The AY-3-8910 has two general-purpose 8-bit parallel I/O ports, A and B, and these are available in the 40-pin package of the same name.

The AY-3-8912 is the same chip in a 28-pin package, with parallel port B simply not connected to any pins. Smaller packages save cost and board space. The 8912 was the most widely used variant.

The AY-3-8913 is the same chip in a 24-pin package, with both parallel ports not connected. Some users thought the small reduction in pin count over the 8912 made it less interesting; however, the I/O registers were rarely used by designers so General Instruments created this fully functional 24 pin alternative and released it approximately 6 months after the 8910 and 8912 chips. The goal was to reduce complexity for the designer and reduce the foot print on the PCB.

The Yamaha YM2149F SSG (Software-controlled Sound Generator) chip has the same pinout as the AY-3-8910, with the minor difference that pin 26 could halve the master clock if pulled low. If left unconnected, as it would be if replacing an AY-3-8910 chip, an internal resistor pulls the pin high, so the master clock is not halved.

The Yamaha YM3439 is a CMOS version of the YM2149F. It is available in two packages: 40-pin DIP (YM3439-D) and 44-pin QFP (YM3439-F).

The Yamaha YMZ294 is one of the newest variants of the YM2149, but in an 18-pin package. Has no parallel ports and only one sound output with the three channels mixed.

The Yamaha YMZ284 is an even smaller variation of the YM2149, in a 16-pin package. It's basically YMZ294 without the 4/6 MHz selection pin and the /TEST pin.

The Yamaha YMZ285 has a 28-pin package and features a built-in PCM. Has no parallel ports and two sound outputs: one with the three SSG channels mixed, other with the PCM output.

The Toshiba T7766A is a compatible chip that has the same pinout as the AY-3-8910 and was used in some MSX models.

The Winbond WF19054, JFC 95101 and the File KC89C72 have the same pinout as the AY-3-8910 and are also 100% software compatible. They're still in production and used on many slot machines.

The AY-3-8914 has the same pinout and is in the same 40-pin package as the AY-3-8910, except the control registers on the chip are shuffled around, and the 'expected input' on the A9 pin may be different. It was used in Mattel's Intellivision console and Aquarius computer.

The AY-3-8930, also known as AY8930, is an enhanced but mostly-backwards-compatible version of the AY-3-8910. The function of the BC2 pin is changed (it is ignored and assumed to be 0 regardless of the pin state), otherwise the pinout is the same as the AY-3-8910. This variant of the chip adds a number of major enhancements, such as separate envelopes for the three channels (as opposed to one shared envelope), variable duty-cycles, more bits of precision for note frequency, volume, and envelope frequency, and a much more configurable noise generator. It was used on the Covox Sound Master sound card for the IBM-PC. Very few games took advantage of it beyond the normal AY-3-8910 features. This chip may have only been produced by Microchip Technology.

Related chips 

Yamaha used the YM2149 core to produce a whole family of music chips which were used in mobile phones, home computers, home and arcade video game systems, etc. For example, the YM2203 (also known as OPN) is basically a YM2149 with FM synthesis added in, as well as its far more advanced successors: the YM2608 (also known as OPNA) which retained all previous features and greatly expanded upon those, the YM2610 (OPNB) which added other features and retained the YM2149 sound channels but not the I/O ports, and the YM2612 (also known as OPN2) which added some features but removed all other ones including the YM2149 sound channels and I/O ports.

Usage

Arcade games 
 1942
 Anteater
 Bagman
 Bomb Jack
 BurgerTime
 Dragon's Lair
 Elevator Action
 Frogger
 Gyruss
 Kangaroo
 Karate Champ
 Moon Patrol
 Omega Race
 Pooyan
 Popeye
 Scramble
 Super Cobra
 Roc'n Rope
 Time Pilot
 Tutankham
 Bally Midway MCR system
 Discs of Tron
 Kick
 Satan's Hollow
 Spy Hunter
 Tapper
 Timber
 Tron
 DECO Cassette System

Home hardware 
 Amstrad CPC (GI AY-3-8912 / Microchip AY38912/P)
 Amstrad GX4000 (Microchip AY38912/P)
 Atari ST (Yamaha YM2149F)
 ATM (computer) - post-soviet ZX Spectrum Clones
 CCE MC-1000 (GI AY-3-8910)
 Fujitsu FM-7 (GI AY-3-8910 in all models except FM77AV / Yamaha OPN in FM77AV)
 Colour Genie (GI AY-3-8910)
 Elektor TV Games Computer
 Intellivision (GI AY-3-8914)
 MSX
 NEC PC-8801 (Yamaha OPN, models PC8801mkII SR models and newer. / Yamaha OPNA, models PC8801 FA and newer.)
 NEC PC-9801 (Yamaha OPN / OPNA (some models), Sound Cards: PC-9801-26, PC-9801-86, Sound Blaster 16 (Optional socket) and others.) 
 Oric-1
 Sharp X1 (GI AY-3-8910 / Yamaha YM2149F)
 Timex Sinclair 2068 (GI AY-3-8912)
 Vectrex (GI AY-3-8912)
 ZX Spectrum 128/+2/+3 (GI AY-3-8912)
 Cricket sound card for Apple II - Echo Plus with two AY-3-8910
 Mockingboard sound card for Apple II
 Mini-Expander for Mattel Aquarius
 Speech/Sound Cartridge for TRS-80 Color Computer

References

External links 
AY-3-8914, AY-3-8916 and AY-3-8917
 General Instruments Micro Electronics Data Catalog 1978

ST SOUND, Hearing the AY-3-8910 chip
AY-3-8910, AY-3-8912 and YM2149 Homepage (AY chip emulator for Win32, big archive of AY music
Blog of Dr. Stack van Hay (in German) Huge microscopic image of AY-3-8910 die and function blocks
FPGA implementation
Video Game Music Preservation Foundation AY-3-8910
AY-3-8910 vs YM2149F

Computer-related introductions in 1978
Sound chips
MSX
Atari ST
Intellivision
ZX Spectrum